Diego Andrés Bermúdez Penabad (born 19 June 1982 in As Pontes de García Rodríguez, A Coruña, Galicia) is a Spanish retired footballer who played as a left back.

External links

La Preferente Profile

1982 births
Living people
Spanish footballers
Segunda División players
Segunda División B players
Tercera División players
SD Compostela footballers
CD Móstoles footballers
CA Osasuna B players
CD Leganés players
AD Alcorcón footballers
Cádiz CF players
Footballers from As Pontes de García Rodríguez
Association football defenders